Waynesville Township is one of thirteen townships in DeWitt County, Illinois, USA.  As of the 2010 census, its population was 713 and it contained 318 housing units.

Geography

Cities, towns, villages
 Waynesville

Cemeteries
The township contains these six cemeteries: Big Grove, Evergreen, Fairview, Halsey, Rock Creek and Union.

Airports and landing strips
 Holt Landing Strip

School districts
 Clinton Community Unit School District 15
 Heyworth Community Unit School District 4
 Olympia Community Unit School District 16

Political districts
 Illinois's 15th congressional district
 State House District 87
 State Senate District 44

References
 
 United States Census Bureau 2009 TIGER/Line Shapefiles
 United States National Atlas

External links
 City-Data.com
 Illinois State Archives
 Township Officials of Illinois

Townships in DeWitt County, Illinois
1858 establishments in Illinois
Populated places established in 1858
Townships in Illinois